Wagla is a village and VDC in Gulmi District in the Lumbini Zone of Western Nepal. At the time of the 1991 Nepal census it had a population of 2736 persons living in 510 individual households.

'''Ward of the wagla VDC.'''

These are the popular place in Wagla VDC in Gulmi District .

References

External links
UN map of the municipalities of Gulmi District

Populated places in Gulmi District